is a Japanese curler from Fujiyoshida.

Career

Juniors
Ishigaki played lead for the Japanese junior women's team (skipped by Sayaka Yoshimura) from 2011 to 2013 winning three straight Pacific-Asia Junior Curling Championships in the process. The team finished in 8th place at the 2011 World Junior Curling Championships, 5th place at the 2012 World Junior Curling Championships and won a bronze medal at the 2013 World Junior Curling Championships. The team also played in two Winter Universiades while Ishigaki was attending Sapporo International University. The team places fourth in 2011 and 7th in 2013.

Women's
Ishigaki joined the Tori Koana rink in 2016, playing lead for the team. They would represent Japan at the 2018 Ford World Women's Curling Championship, with Ishigaki playing second on the team.

To begin the 2019-20 curling season, Ishigaki and her team won the Morioka City Women's Memorial Cup and finished runner-up at the 2019 Cargill Curling Training Centre Icebreaker.

Teams

Personal life
Ishigaki works as an amusement park employee for Fujikyu Highland Co. Ltd.

References

External links

Living people
1991 births
Japanese female curlers
People from Kitami, Hokkaido
Sportspeople from Yamanashi Prefecture
20th-century Japanese women
21st-century Japanese women